Chambers is an unincorporated community in Apache County, Arizona, United States. Chambers has a post office with ZIP code 86502.

History
Chambers was named after Edward Chambers, Vice President of the Atchison, Topeka, and Santa Fe Railroad system. Chambers was responsible for opening the town's first post office in 1907. A native of Illinois, Chambers was instrumental of the development of the railroad across the western United States- and is recognized as one of the men "Who Made San Francisco". Following many years with the Santa Fe Railroad System, Chambers became Director of the Division of Traffic under President Herbert Hoover.

The railroad official was born in Waukegan, Illinois on February 16, 1859. From freight handler Chambers, after he entered railroading, became foreman, and cashier at Pueblo, agent at San Diego and Los Angeles, assistant general freight agent at Los Angeles, general freight agent for lines west of Albuquerque; in 1905 he was made assistant freight traffic manager on coast lines with headquarters in San Francisco. During the war he was director of transportation for the United States Food Administration and Grain Corporation. He was director for the division of traffic of the United States Railroad administration from January 1919 to May, 1920 as well as a member of the War Industrial Board. Chambers, whose home was in Chicago, maintained a residence in San Francisco. Chambers died in 1927 and was survived by his three sons, H. E., R.L. and W. P. Chambers.

While not named after him, Charles Chambers was responsible for setting up a small trading post in Chambers, Arizona. The name was changed to Halloysite for a period in honor of clay that was mined nearby, but changed back to Chambers on June 1, 1930.

The population of Chambers was estimated as 150 in the 1960 census.

See also

References

External links

Unincorporated communities in Apache County, Arizona
Unincorporated communities in Arizona